The 1902 Connecticut gubernatorial election was held on November 4, 1902. Republican nominee Abiram Chamberlain defeated Democratic nominee Melbert B. Cary with 53.44% of the vote.

General election

Candidates
Major party candidates
Abiram Chamberlain, Republican
Melbert B. Cary, Democratic

Other candidates
Francis E. Wheeler, Socialist
Robert N. Stanley, Prohibition
Ernest Oatley, Socialist Labor

Results

References

1902
Connecticut
Gubernatorial